François-Xavier Villain (born 31 May 1950 in Abbeville, Somme) was a member of the National Assembly of France.  He represented the Nord department, from 2002 to 2017 and is a member of Arise the Republic, a small Gaullist party led by Nicolas Dupont-Aignan. He is also mayor of Cambrai.

References

1950 births
Living people
People from Abbeville
Politicians from Hauts-de-France
Rally for the Republic politicians
Union for a Popular Movement politicians
Debout la France politicians
Sciences Po alumni
Mayors of places in Hauts-de-France
People from Cambrai
Deputies of the 12th National Assembly of the French Fifth Republic
Deputies of the 13th National Assembly of the French Fifth Republic
Deputies of the 14th National Assembly of the French Fifth Republic
Union of Democrats and Independents politicians